Valarie is a given name, similar to Valerie.

Valarie Allman (born 1995), American track and field athlete
Valarie Hodges (born 1955), American businesswoman and politician
Valarie Jenkins (born 1986), American disc golfer
Valarie Kaur (born 1981), American civil rights activist, documentary filmmaker, lawyer, educator and faith leader
Valarie Lawson (born 1966), American politician
Valarie Rae Miller (born 1974), American actress
Valarie Pettiford (born 1960), American stage and television actress, dancer, and jazz singer
Valarie Wilson, American educator
Valarie Zeithaml, American marketing professor and author

Feminine given names
English feminine given names